

Released songs

Studio recordings

Live recordings

Notes

References

 
Wilson, Brian
The Beach Boys